Rajampet is a Municipality in Annamayya district of the Indian state of Andhra Pradesh, located in the Rayalaseema Region formed on the banks of Cheyyeru River. It consists of 29 election wards.

Rajampet is an Assembly constituency, Lok Sabha constituency, Annamayya district, and a Forest Division. It is located in Rajampet mandal of Rajampeta revenue division. It is bordered by Tirupati to the south, Nellore to the east, Sri Sathya Sai to the west, and YSR district to the north.

Education 
The primary and secondary school education is imparted by government aided and private schools of the School Education Department of the state Government of Andhra Pradesh. The medium of instruction followed by different schools are English and Telugu.
Rajampet has some of famous institution for ENGINEERING Annamacharya Institute of Technology & Sciences (AITS), Narayanadri Institute of Science and Technology (NIST)

Governance

Civil administration 
Rajampet is a municipality of area  in Annamayya District (Formarly Kadapa District). It consists of 20 election wards. In 2019 this town was upgraded into a Grade II Municipality which is headed by a Municipal Chairman and governed by a Municipal Commissioner.

Politics 
Rajampet is a Lok sabha constituency since 1957 and it is a Lok Sabha constituency of the twenty-five lok sabha constituencies from Andhra Pradesh in India and only one Parliamentary Constituency in the district. 

Currently P.V.Midhun Reddy Member of Parliament (India) of YSR Congress Party won from Rajampet (Lok Sabha constituency) from General elections held on 2019. 

Meda Venkata Mallikarjuna Reddy is the present Member of Legislative Assembly (MLA) of the Rajampet Assembly constituency for  the YSR Congress Party.

Transport

Roadways
Rajampet  is the entranceway to the pilgrimage site of Tirumala.

• National Highway NH 716 : Chennai-Kurnool Green filed Corridor, passes through the town.

• Proposed NH 370 Nellore to Anathapuram (Nellore–Rapur–Rajampet–Rayachoti–Kadiri–Anathapuram) is currently under planning.

• Rajampeta well connected to all major national highways NH 40, NH 16, NH 75. 

The Andhra Pradesh State Road Transport Corporation operates bus services from Sri Annamayya Bus Station and from Town Old Bus Station to Major cities Kadapa, Tirupati, Nellore, Kurnool, Hyderabad, Chennai, Bengaluru, Anantapur, and to other towns and villages in the district.

Railways
Rajampet has its own railway station, which is a major station in the district that comes under the South Central Railway Zone of Guntakal railway division.

• Rajampeta is the only railway station well connected to major cities from the Annamayya District (Rajampeta).

• Very well railway connected to Chennai, Mumbai, Delhi, Hyderabad, Guntakal, Hubli, Goa, Arakonam, Renigunta Junction, Kurnool, Kolhapur.

Airways
The nearest airports from Rajampeta are:

• Local transport is available from the bus and railway stations to the airports.

See also 
 List of municipalities in Andhra Pradesh
 Annamayya district

References

External links

 Rajampet Town
 Rajampet Municipality

Villages in Kadapa district